Fate of a Dreamer is an album by Arjen Anthony Lucassen under the name Ambeon, released in 2001 by Dutch music label Transmission Records. All of the ten tracks feature samples from and arrangements of Ayreon's songs, as noted below. The album was out of print for years, due to the closing of Transmission.  The album was re-released in December 2011 with bonus tracks, and an accompanying acoustic CD covering various Ambeon and Ayreon tracks.

Track listing

Single

Cold Metal 

"Cold Metal" is the only single from this album. It has samples of Ayreon's "Into the Black Hole", from the album Universal Migrator Part 2: Flight of the Migrator.

Track listing
 "Cold Metal (Remix Single Version)"
 "Merry-Go-Round"
 "High (Remix)"
 "Cold Metal (Album Version)"

Personnel 
Astrid van der Veen – vocals, background vocals
Arjen Lucassen – acoustic and electric guitar, keys, samples
Stephen van Haestregt – acoustic and electronic drums, percussion
Walter Latupeirissa – bass, fretless bass

Guest musicians 
John McManus – alto flute, uilleann pipes
Pat McManus – viola
Erik Norlander – synthesizers
Lana Lane – reversed background vocals

Ayreon's song reference 
"Estranged": "Ye Courtyard Minstrel Boy" (from The Final Experiment)
"Ashes": "Back on Planet Earth" (from Actual Fantasy)
"High": "The Shooting Company of Captain Frans B. Cocq" (from Universal Migrator Part 1: The Dream Sequencer)
"Cold Metal": "Into the Black Hole" (from Universal Migrator Part 2: Flight of the Migrator)
"Fate": "Welcome to the New Dimension" and "Forever of the Stars" (both from Into the Electric Castle)
"Sick Ceremony": "Magic Ride" (from The Final Experiment)
"Lost Message": "The Charm of the Seer" (from The Final Experiment) and "Carried by the Wind" (from Universal Migrator Part 1: The Dream Sequencer)
"Surreal": "And the Druids Turn to Stone" and "Carried by the Wind" (both from Universal Migrator Part 1: The Dream Sequencer)
"Sweet Little Brother": "2084" (from Universal Migrator Part 1: The Dream Sequencer)
"Dreamer": "Computer Eyes" (from Actual Fantasy)
"Merry-Go-Round": "The Dawn of Man" (from Actual Fantasy)

References

2001 debut albums
Ambeon albums
Transmission (record label) albums